Anderson Park is a county park located in Montclair, New Jersey, United States. Anderson Park is part of the Essex County Park System.

History
In the late 19th century C.W. Anderson, founder of the park, and a prominent Montclair resident, and record-holding commuter, decided that there should be a park from Bellevue Avenue to Watchung Avenue and from the railroad right-of-way to North Mountain Road. The land which he was talking about at the time was a swampy area that many thought to be a health risk.

Eventually Montclair started a commission and the Frederick Law Olmsted firm was chosen to design the park, and it was completed on August 4, 1903. This firm is well known for designing much of the National Mall in Washington D.C. and Central Park in New York City. In the end the park plans called for a smaller park that only extended to where Parkside Road is now located.

The park has the distinction of being the first park in the Essex County Park Commission system, which was New Jersey's first county-wide network of parks.

In the 1960s, due to police complaints, the many large clumps of bushes all around the park were removed.

In 2006 fifty garbage cans were installed around the park, and the soccer fields were redone as part of a general renovation.  The public disapproved of trash cans every , so many were removed.

In August 2007 swastikas and other racist graffiti was found in the park, and promptly removed.

Name
The park was originally going to be called 'Montclair Park', but the town wanted it to be renamed to Anderson Park in honor of the man who thought up the idea of the park and funded some of it, C.W. Anderson.

Qualities
The park has a circuitous path that goes around its central lawn and is exactly 3/5 of a mile long. On the path there are many places to stop and take a rest at the many, newly installed benches. It is possible to walk around at night because in early 2008 new lights were installed which are around the path. The park has a large open grass space that takes up most of the park and is sometimes used for lacrosse and field hockey games. The park is also host to an Arts and Crafts fair annually.

Location
Anderson Park is located in Northern Montclair, very close to the slope of the First Watchung Mountain. It is in a small depression caused by Toney's Brook, which flows through the park.  Anderson Park is within approximately two minutes of walking distance from the center of the commercial zone in Upper Montclair on Bellevue Avenue and Valley Road,  the Upper Montclair Railway Station,  and is across the street from the childhood home of Buzz Aldrin.  The park is bordered in the north by Bellevue Avenue, in the west by North Mountain Avenue, in the south by Parkside Avenue, and in the east by Toney's Brook and the railroad right of way of New Jersey Transit's Montclair-Boonton Line.

Gallery

See also
National Register of Historic Places listings in Essex County, New Jersey

References

External links

 Essex County Parks
Friends of Anderson Park

County parks in New Jersey
Montclair, New Jersey
Upper Montclair, New Jersey
Parks in Essex County, New Jersey
National Register of Historic Places in Essex County, New Jersey